Lake Kyyjärvi is a medium-sized lake in Kyyjärvi municipality, Finland. It is a starting point of the Saarijärvi Whitewater Route, a continuous watercourse in Central Finland.

See also
List of lakes in Finland

References

Kyyjärvi
Landforms of Central Finland